Day69 is the debut commercial mixtape by American rapper 6ix9ine. It was released on February 23, 2018, independently by ScumGang Records and TenThousand Projects (of which was formerly known as Elliott Grainge Entertainment). The mixtape features guest appearances from Young Thug, Tory Lanez, Fetty Wap, A Boogie wit da Hoodie and Offset.

Day69 was supported by four official singles: "Gummo", "Kooda", "Keke"  with Fetty Wap and A Boogie wit da Hoodie, and "Gotti".

Background
On February 20, 2018, 6ix9ine revealed the final cover artwork and tracklist of the mixtape.

On February 24, a day after the mixtape's release, an artist on Tumblr with the username "cryptidsp00n" pointed out that the artist of the Day69 cover artwork traced over their artwork featuring the Adventure Time character Flame Princess.

Promotion
On February 10, 2018, 6ix9ine previewed the first track off the mixtape, called "Billy" on his Instagram account. The music video for the track was released on March 4, 2018.

Singles
The first official single for Day69, called "Gummo" was released on November 10, 2017. The song was produced by Pi'erre Bourne. The song peaked at number 12 on the US Billboard Hot 100.

On December 3, 2017, 6ix9ine released the second official single for the mixtape, called "Kooda". The song references ScumGang Records, Xanax, Ruger and Fendi, among others. The song debuted at number 61 on the US Billboard Hot 100 in the week of December 23, 2017, and peaked at number 50. An accompanying music video for the song premiered on WorldStarHipHop via its YouTube channel. It features 6ix9ine in the streets of New York with members of the Bloods and Crips gangs, in a similar vein to the music video for "Gummo".

On January 14, 2018, 6ix9ine released the third official single, "Keke" with American rappers Fetty Wap and A Boogie wit da Hoodie. The song was previewed by 6ix9ine in late 2017 via his Instagram, with the song leaking on December 29, 2017. The music video was premiered on WorldStarHipHop's official YouTube channel on January 14, 2018. It was directed by Figure Eight Films and features 6ix9ine, Fetty Wap and A Boogie wit da Hoodie in the streets of New York, in similar vein to 6ix9ine's music video for "Gummo" and "Kooda". The song entered at number 63 on the US Billboard Hot 100, peaking at number 43 on the chart dated February 3, 2018.

The fourth official single from Day69, "Gotti" was released on April 21, 2018.

Critical reception

Day69 received mixed reviews from music critics. In a negative review, Charles Aaron of Rolling Stone stated that Day69 is "a grim dud. Unlike similarly cartoonish figures, like Onyx or Waka Flocka Flame, 6ix9ine flashes no humor or attempts at phrase-making or, um, songwriting. His overly reverbed flow is little more than an uncontrolled gusher of bullying faux-menace." Daniel Offner of Salute Magazine stated that "in terms of carrying its own weight, the album delivers with direct effect", adding that Day69 "comes to close with a full mag and one in the chamber."

Online publication HotNewHipHop criticized the mixtape's production and lyrical content, considering the project to be formulaic: "All things considered, DAY69 is a staggering failure of artistic statement, especially for a rapper seeking to prove his worth to the rap game. Whether it's the unremarkable production, his own limitations as a rapper, or the severe drop in quality beyond the singles, there's not much going on to justify his existence in the rap game beyond an unfortunate habit of generating negative attention."

Trent Clark of HipHopDX believed the mixtape provided a refreshing return to hardcore hip hop, also stating: "Of course, even with the short runtime, there's only so much bellowing and make-believe bodycounting listeners can take before they openly admit they don't want any more smoke. A kick-in-the-door project like Day69 is ripe for establishing a rap game motif but does little to crack the mystique surrounding the mind underneath the multi-colored mane."

Commercial performance
Day69 debuted at number four on the US Billboard 200 chart, earning 55,000 album-equivalent units (including 20,000 traditional album sales) in its first week. In its second week, the album fell to number ten on the chart, earning an additional 24,000 units. On May 8, 2018, the mixtape was certified gold by the Recording Industry Association of America (RIAA) for combined sales and album-equivalent units of over 500,000 units in the United States.

Track listing

Notes
  signifies a co-producer
 Every song is stylized in uppercase letters. For example, "Gummo" is stylized as "GUMMO".
 "Billy" features additional vocals by Shotti

Personnel
Credits adapted from Tidal.

 Wizard Lee Weinberg – mixing, mastering, recording

Charts

Weekly charts

Year-end charts

Certifications

Release history

References

2018 mixtape albums
6ix9ine albums
Hip hop albums by American artists
Albums produced by Pi'erre Bourne